Batrachedra agaura is a species of moth in the family Batrachedridae. It is endemic to New Zealand. This species is distributed throughout the country. The species inhabits native forest especially beech and kanuka forest or manuka scrubland. The larvae of this species is associated with sooty mold and with sooty beech scale. It has been hypothesised that the larvae feed on sooty beech scale. However they may also feed on the sooty mold itself. The adult female is lighter in appearance than the male and the species shows considerable variation in patterns on forewing. Adults are on the wing from October to February. They are nocturnal and occasionally attracted to light.

Taxonomy
This species was described in 1901 by Edward Meyrick. George Hudson discussed and illustrated this species both in his 1928 publication The Butterflies and Moths of New Zealand, and in his 1950 book Fragments of New Zealand entomology. John S. Dugdale criticised the quality of Hudson's illustrations arguing that the images were not as brown as specimens of the moth. The lectotype was collected by Meyrick at Mount Arthur below Flora Saddle in the Nelson district. This specimen is held at the Natural History Museum, London.

Description

Meyrick described the species as follows:

Alfred Philpott described the proboscis of the adult of this species as being long and well developed. The female of the species is lighter in appearance than the male. The colour and markings of this species shows considerable variation.

Distribution
This species is endemic to New Zealand. Specimens have been collected from Kaeo in the North Island to Invercargill in the South Island and it is regarded as being generally distributed throughout the country. This species has also been recorded at Pitt Island in the Chatham Islands.

Biology and behaviour
Adults are on the wing from October to February. They are nocturnal and are occasionally attracted to light. The larvae form a cocoon in their feeding place and pupate there.

Habitat and host species
This moth prefers native forest habitat, especially beech forest and manuka scrubland. It is also known to inhabit kanuka forest. The larvae of this species is associated with sooty mold and sooty beech scale. It has been hypothesised that B. agaura larvae feed on sooty beech scale. However they may also feed on the sooty mold itself. If B. agaura are found to consume scale insects this species will be one of the few that have larvae that are predatory.

References

Batrachedridae
Moths of New Zealand
Moths described in 1901
Endemic fauna of New Zealand
Taxa named by Edward Meyrick
Endemic moths of New Zealand